The cassock-alb or cassalb is a relatively modern garment and is a combination of the traditional cassock and alb. It developed as a convenient undergarment worn by clergy and as an alternative to the alb for deacons and acolytes.

Usage 

A white or off-white cassock-alb has replaced the traditional cassock and alb in some Anglican churches since the 1970s. This garment is not the same as the chasuble-alb, which is approved for use in the Roman Catholic Church in certain circumstances.

See also 

 Vestment

Anglican vestments
Lutheran vestments
Roman Catholic vestments